Crossings is the tenth album by jazz pianist Herbie Hancock, released in 1972. It is the second album in his Mwandishi period, which saw him experimenting in electronics and funk with a sextet featuring saxophonist Bennie Maupin, trumpeter Eddie Henderson, trombonist Julian Priester, bassist Buster Williams and drummer Billy Hart. The album is the band's first to feature synthesizer player Patrick Gleeson. He was scheduled to "set up his Moog for Hancock to play." However, Hancock was so impressed with Gleeson that he "asked Gleeson not only to do the overdubs on the album but join the group."

Crossings, along with Fat Albert Rotunda and Mwandishi, was reissued in one set as Mwandishi: The Complete Warner Bros. Recordings in 1994 and as The Warner Bros. Years (1969-1972) in 2014.

Track listing

Original LP

Side A 
 "Sleeping Giant" (Herbie Hancock) – 24:50

Side B 
 "Quasar" (Bennie Maupin) – 7:27
 "Water Torture" (Maupin) – 14:04

Personnel
 Herbie Hancock – piano, electric piano, mellotron, percussion
 Eddie Henderson – trumpet, flugelhorn, percussion
 Bennie Maupin – soprano saxophone, alto flute, bass clarinet, piccolo, percussion
 Julian Priester – tenor and alto trombones, bass, percussion
 Buster Williams – bass guitar, double bass, percussion
 Billy Hart – drums, percussion

With:
 Patrick Gleeson – Moog synthesizer
 Victor Pantoja – congas
 Candy Love, Sandra Stevens, Della Horne, Victoria Domagalski, Scott Beach – voices

References 

1970 albums
Herbie Hancock albums
Albums produced by Dave Rubinson
Warner Records albums
Jazz fusion albums by American artists